The 1997 Ameritech Cup was a women's tennis tournament played on indoor carpet courts at the UIC Pavilion in Chicago, Illinois in the United States that was part of Tier II of the 1997 WTA Tour. It was the 26th and last edition of the tournament and was held from November 3/9, 1997. Third-seeded Lindsay Davenport won the singles title and earned $79,000 first-prize money.

Finals

Singles

 Lindsay Davenport defeated  Nathalie Tauziat 6–0, 7–5
 It was Davenport's 12th title of the year and the 30th of her career.

Doubles

 Alexandra Fusai /  Nathalie Tauziat defeated  Lindsay Davenport /  Monica Seles 6–3, 6–2
 It was Fusai's 3rd title of the year and the 4th of her career. It was Tauziat's 3rd title of the year and the 18th of her career.

References

External links
 International Tennis Federation (ITF) tournament edition details
 Tournament draws

Ameritech Cup
Ameritech Cup
November 1997 sports events in the United States
1990s in Chicago
1997 in Illinois
1997 in sports in Illinois
1997 in American tennis